Karim Braham Chaouch (born July 17, 1978 in Algiers, Algeria) is an Algerian former footballer who played as a forward.

Club career
 1997–1999 IB Khémis El Khechna
 1999–2001 CR Bordj El Kiffan
 2001–2001 MC Alger
 2001–2002 JSM Chéraga
 2002–2006 MC Alger
 2006–2008 JSM Béjaïa
 2008–2008 MSP Batna
 2009–2009 JS Kabylie
 2010–2010 NA Hussein Dey
 2010? MC Oran

References

Living people
1978 births
Association football forwards
Algerian footballers
Footballers from Algiers
Algerian Ligue Professionnelle 1 players
Algerian Ligue 2 players
JS Kabylie players
MC Alger players
NA Hussein Dey players
JSM Béjaïa players
MSP Batna players
MC Oran players
Paradou AC players
JSM Chéraga players
IB Khémis El Khechna players
21st-century Algerian people